Saridey Varalakshmi (13 August 1925 – 22 September 2009) was an Indian actress and singer who worked in Telugu and Tamil-language films. She was popular for her roles and songs in Telugu films like Sri Venkateswara Mahatyam (1960) and  Mahamantri Timmarasu (1962) and Tamil films like Veerapandiya Kattabomman (1959) and in Poova Thalaiya (1969).

Life
Varalakshmi was born in Jaggampeta, Andhra Pradesh, India. She started her career as child artist in saint role in Balayogini (1937), when she was nine years old. Gudavalli Ramabrahmam was engaged by the pioneer filmmaker K. Subramanyam to direct the Telugu version of this movie. He spotted young Varalakshmi in Kurnool. Subramanyam later cast her in his classic Seva Sadanam (1938) with M. S. Subbulakshmi. She played a young friend of the heroine (M.S.), and they became close friends. She played a young girl's role in Parasuraman (Tamil, 1940) along with T. R. Mahalingam. T. R. Sundaram, cast her in a major role in his box office hit 'Aayiram Thalai Vaangi Apoorva Chinthamani' (1947). The title role was played by V. N. Janaki. The film was a major success and Govindan and Varalakshmi made an attractive pair. T. R. Sundaram cast her again in the lead role in 'Bhojan' (1948). Her first successful movie was Balaraju in 1948 produced and directed by Ghantasala Balaramaiah. She later acted with all top heroes in Telugu and Tamil industries including M K Tyagaraja Bhagavatar in the classic Tamil film by B A Subba Rao called 'Syamala' in 1953; Sivaji Ganesan (Veerapandiya Kattabbomman), M. G. Ramachandran (Chakravarthi Thirumagal, Maattukara Velan, Needhikku Thalaivanangu), Gemini Ganesan (Poova Thalaiya, Panama Pasama), N. T. Rama Rao (Satya Harischandra), A. Nageswara Rao(ANR) (Balaraju), V. Nagayya (Naga Panchami), Ranjan (En Magan) and R. S. Manohar (Maamiyaar). She was also famous for her voice, and sung her songs in all movies she acted. Her roles as Sivaji's wife  in Veerapandiya Kattabomman, and important roles in Poova Thalaiya, Savale Samali, Maattukkara Velan, Shivaji's sister in Raja Raja Chozhan and Neethikku thalaivanangu won her critical acclaim as a talented singer and actress in Tamil movies. In her later career, she acted in mother and aunt roles. She married film producer A. L. Srinivasan, an elder brother of Kavignar Kannadasan; they had two children named Nalini and Muruga She continued to act after marriage in senior roles in Telugu and Tamil cinema. She sang many beautiful songs in Telugu and Tamil films.

Her son, S. Muruga, died after suffering cardiac arrest in Chennai on 22 October 2013. He lived for 48 years.

Her daughter Nalini is a homemaker with 2 children.

Death
Varalakshmi was bedridden during the last 6 months of her life after she fell and injured her back. She died on 22 September 2009.

Honors and awards
She has received several awards commending her service to Tamil cinema. The most recent ones were:
 Sivaji Ganesan Memorial Award Presented by the Sivaji Family in Oct 2007
 Kavignar Kannadasan Award presented by the Tamil Nadu Government in 2004

Filmography
Note: The lists are not comprehensive.

References

External links
 

1927 births
2009 deaths
Accidental deaths from falls
Accidental deaths in India
Indian women playback singers
Indian film actresses
Telugu playback singers
20th-century Indian singers
20th-century Indian actresses
Tamil playback singers
Actresses in Tamil cinema
Actresses in Telugu cinema
Actresses from Andhra Pradesh
Singers from Andhra Pradesh
People from East Godavari district
Indian child actresses
Child actresses in Telugu cinema
20th-century Indian women singers
Film musicians from Andhra Pradesh
Women musicians from Andhra Pradesh